Lake Pillsbury is a lake in the Mendocino National Forest of Lake County, California, created from the Eel River and Hull Mountain watershed by Scott Dam. Activities in the Lake Pillsbury Recreation Area include powerboating, fishing, swimming, sailing, picnicking, hiking and hang gliding. There are two main access roads to the lake. At the north end of the lake is a small gravel airstrip. About 400 vacation cabins including National Forest Recreational Residences (private cabin leases of public lands) ring the lake.

History 
In 1906, W.W. Van Arsdale formed the Eel River Power and Irrigation Company and contracted with the city of Ukiah for a hydroelectric generating station to increase electricity supply for the city. A diversion dam was built on the Eel River and a mile-long tunnel was constructed to divert water into the Russian River. A powerhouse was constructed in Potter Valley. It was called the Potter Valley Project or Eel River Project.

Later that year, the Snow Mountain Water and Power Company incorporated and took over the project from Van Arsdale's company. By 1908 water was being diverted to the power plant and then to the Russian River.

Scott Dam was completed in 1921 as a concrete gravity structure, 138 feet high, 805 feet long at its crest, and impounding a maximum capacity of 86,400 acre-feet.  It maintains water flow to the hydroelectric plant during times of low water runoff.  Pacific Gas and Electric Company (PG&E) acquired the project in 1933,  and maintains the facilities today.  The lake is named for one of the founders of Snow Mountain Water and Power Company. The Pillsbury hydroelectric plant is the only one in the north coast region of California operated by PG&E.

In 1969, performers Jack Haley and Jackie Gleason purchased the Fuller Ranch and created the Pillsbury Ranch subdivision.

In 2019, PG&E notified the Federal Energy Regulatory Commission they would not seek to re-license the Potter Valley project noting the project was no longer economically viable. As part of PG&E's divestment of the Potter Valley Hydropower Project, PG&E will need to submit a decommissioning plan to the Federal Energy Regulatory Commission when the Project's license expires in April 2022.

Recreation 
There are five campgrounds,  two group campgrounds, two paved boat ramps and a resort at the lake.  The Lake Pillsbury Resort operates a marina with rentals, boat slips  and supplies. All types of boating are allowed, including boat camping.

California Department of Fish and Game stock the lake with trout annually. Other fish include black bass, steelhead, and pikeminnow.

The California Office of Environmental Health Hazard Assessment (OEHHA) has developed a safe eating advisory for Lake Pillsbury based on levels of mercury or PCBs found in fish caught from this water body.

In 2022, Lake County health officials reported that recent testing found concerning levels of cyanobacteria in Lake Pillsbury. The toxic chemicals sometimes produced by these algal blooms are referred to as “cyanotoxins.” Exposure to these toxins causes sickness and other severe health effects in
people, pets, and livestock. Those who plan to recreate in or on Lake Pillsbury should look for informational signs posted throughout the county and avoid contact with water that, looks like spilled green or blue-green paint; has surface scums, mats, or films; has a blue or green crust at the shoreline; is discolored or has green-colored streaks; or has greenish globs suspended in the water beneath the surface.
 
Hiking trails at the lake include an interpretive nature trail at Sunset Campground and the  Lake Shore Loop Trail. Other nearby recreational opportunities include the Snow Mountain Wilderness located east of Lake Pillsbury. The Bloody Rock historic area is located within the wildlife refuge north of the lake as well as the Eel River and the Wild and Scenic Black Butte River.

Wildlife

 
Hunted to near extinction during the California Gold Rush era, the animals were reintroduced to the Lake Pillsbury Basin in the late 1970s by the California Department of Fish and Game, and the herd has steadily grown, numbering around 80 in 2007.

The elk live on the north shore of the lake at the bottom of Hull Mountain, and enjoy wild clovers and grasses, along with the green summer and fall foliage around Lake Pillsbury's edges. Mendocino National Forest and Los Padres National Forest are the only two national forests in California to have tule elk, thought 22 herds are found across the state. There is a ten-day hunting season beginning on the second Wednesday in September each year.

See also
 List of dams and reservoirs in California
 List of lakes in California
 List of lakes in Lake County, California

References

 
 USFS Mendocino National Forest Tule Elk Management
 California Department of Fish & Game

External links 
 Mendocino National Forest Lake Pillsbury 
 Lake Pillsbury Alliance

 The Friends of the Eel River

Pillsbury
Mendocino National Forest
Hang gliding sites
Eel River (California)
Pillsbury
Gliding in the United States
Pillsbury
Pillsbury
1921 establishments in California